Andre Anter David (born May 18, 1958), is a retired Assyrian Major League Baseball outfielder who played during parts of the 1984 and 1986 seasons with the Minnesota Twins.   He played in 38 games and had 13 hits with 1 home run and a .245 batting average during his career.  His sole home run was hit during his first official at bat in the Major Leagues.

He played high school ball at Chatsworth High School in Chatsworth, CA.
He played college ball at Cal-State Fullerton and was drafted in the 8th round of the 1980 draft by the Twins.

He served as the assistant hitting coach for the Kansas City Royals in the early part of the 2013 season.

References

External links

1958 births
Living people
Major League Baseball outfielders
Baseball players from California
Minnesota Twins players
Cal State Fullerton Titans baseball players
Minor league baseball managers
Minor league baseball coaches
Visalia Oaks players
Orlando Twins players
Toledo Mud Hens players
Tidewater Tides players
El Paso Diablos players
Chatsworth High School alumni